HMAS Lismore (J145/B247/A121), named for the city of Lismore, New South Wales, was one of 60 Bathurst-class corvettes that were constructed during World War II, and one of 20 manned and commissioned by the Royal Australian Navy (RAN) under Admiralty order. During her Australian service, Lismore covered , and spent the longest period away from Australia of any RAN vessel during World War II: 1,409 days. Serving with the RAN for five years, Lismore later spent twelve years as part of the Royal Netherlands Navy (RNLN), classified as the frigate HNLMS Batjan.

Design and construction

In 1938, the Australian Commonwealth Naval Board (ACNB) identified the need for a general purpose 'local defence vessel' capable of both anti-submarine and mine-warfare duties, while easy to construct and operate. Construction of the prototype  did not go ahead, but the plans were retained. The need for locally built 'all-rounder' vessels at the start of World War II saw the "Australian Minesweepers" (designated as such to hide their anti-submarine capability, but popularly referred to as "corvettes") approved in September 1939, with 60 constructed during the course of the war: 36 ordered by the RAN, 20 (including Lismore) ordered by the British Admiralty but manned and commissioned as RAN vessels, and 4 for the Royal Indian Navy.

Lismore was laid down by Morts Dock & Engineering Co in Sydney on 26 February 1940. She was launched on 10 August 1940 by the wife of Commodore Gerard Muirhead-Gould, the Naval-Officer-in-Charge Sydney, and commissioned on 25 January 1941.

Operational service
From December 1941 Lismore operated with the British Eastern Fleet. On 17 June 1943, when the British troopship  was sunk off the coast of Libya, Lismore and her sister ship  were among the ships that rescued 1,477 survivors. In December 1944, Lismore was assigned to the British Pacific Fleet.

The corvette earned four battle honours for her wartime service: "Indian Ocean 1941–44", "Sicily 1943", "Pacific 1945", and "Okinawa 1945".

Lismore was paid off from RAN service on 3 July 1946, transferring immediately into the Royal Netherlands Navy, where she was renamed HNLMS Batjan and reclassified as a frigate. She was removed from service in 1958.

Citations

References
Books

Journal and news articles

Bathurst-class corvettes of the Royal Australian Navy
Ships built in New South Wales
1940 ships
World War II corvettes of Australia